White Wolf is a Canadian heavy metal band from Edmonton, Alberta, led by Don Wolf.

History
White Wolf originally formed in 1975 under the name Slamm, then changed to Warrior before settling on White Wolf. The group played locally for several years before landing a recording contract with RCA Records; their debut album, Standing Alone, was issued on the label in 1984. The band toured in Canada, the United States, Europe and Japan in support of the album.

A second album, Endangered Species, was released in 1986.  The album included one song which was made into a music video: "She".

The group disbanded shortly after completing the album, but released a third album with new material, Victim Of The Spotlight, in 2007. They came together again for a tour of Germany that year; a concert from this tour was recorded live and released in 2008 by Escape Music as WHITE WOLF Live in Germany.

As of 2016, White Wolf continues to perform occasionally at local venues.

Members
Current members:
Don Wolf (Wilk) - vocals, keyboards
Cam McLeod - lead guitar, vocals, record producer
Scott Webb - rhythm & lead guitar, backing vocals
Russel Berquist - bass, backing vocals
Brendan Ostrander - drums, backing vocals
David J Petovar - keyboards, backing vocals

Past members:
Rick Nelson - guitar
Loris Bolzon - drums
Les Schwartz - bass
Martin Kronlund - guitar
Richard Quist - bass, keyboards
Imre Daun - drums
Dale Christie - guitar

Discography
Standing Alone (RCA, 1984), U.S. No. 162
Endangered Species (RCA, 1986), U.S. No. 137
Victim of the Spotlight (Escape Music, 2007)
Standing Alone/Endangered Species (2 disc digipack) (Escape Music, 2007)
Live in Germany (Escape Music, 2009)

References

Canadian heavy metal musical groups
Musical groups established in 1975
Musical groups disestablished in 1986
Musical groups from Edmonton
1975 establishments in Alberta
1986 disestablishments in Canada